Tsianina Joelson, or Tsianina Lohmann (pronounced "Cha'-nee-na", born Tsianina Marie Means on January 16, 1975) is an American actress, fitness model, and former beauty queen.
  
Joelson was born in 1975 in Coquille, Oregon to Ken and Betty Means. She was crowned Miss Coos County in 1993. She was married to fellow Oregonian Greg Joelson (played four games in NFL in 1991) when she won Fitness America's Miss Fitness USA competition in 1997. She married Michael Lohmann in 2004.

Joelson was the co-host of the short-lived summer 1998 MTV series The Daily Burn. Her most recognized movie role is for the 2000 film Bring It On, where she played wealthy cheerleader Darcy. From 2000-2001 she also had four appearances in the role of Varia, an Amazon, on Xena: Warrior Princess in the 6th and final season.

Filmography

Film

Television

See also
List of female fitness & figure competitors

References

External links

Tsianina Joelson Unlimited

1975 births
American female bodybuilders
American exercise instructors
Female models from Oregon
American film actresses
American television actresses
Fitness and figure competitors
Living people
Actresses from Oregon
American beauty pageant winners
20th-century American actresses
21st-century American actresses
People from Coquille, Oregon